Etubom Anthony Ani was the Minister of state for Foreign affairs and Finance Minister of Nigeria from 1994 - 1998 during the Sani Abacha regime.
He  hails from Odukpani local government area of Cross River State in southern Nigeria.

He is also a former Chairman of KPMG, former
President  of the Institute of Chartered Accountants of Nigeria (ICAN).
Chief Ani, is the Clan Head of Mbiabo Ikoneto in Cross River State, in the Niger delta region of Nigeria.
He was a career accountant who was appointed by General Sani Abacha as Minister of state for Foreign Affairs in 1993 and was subsequent appointed as the Minister of finance in 1994.

References

1936 births
Living people
Finance ministers of Nigeria